Mbini is a town in Río Muni, Equatorial Guinea, lying at the mouth of the Benito River. Mbini is the Ndowe name for Río Muni. It is located 44 km southwest of Bata.

In 1994, the population was around 14,000 and the city is linked by ferry with Bolondo.  The town is known for its seafood and for nearby beaches.

Populated places in Litoral (Equatorial Guinea)